Doris is a genus of sea slugs, specifically dorid nudibranchs. These animals are marine gastropod molluscs in the family Dorididae.

Species
Species within the genus Doris include:

 Doris acerico Ortea & Espinosa, 2017
 Doris adrianae Urgorri, Señarís, Díaz-Agras, Candás & Gómez-Rodríguez, 2021
 Doris alboranica Bouchet, 1977
 Doris ananas Lima, Tibiriça & Simone, 2016
 Doris atypica (Eliot, 1906)
 Doris beringiensis (Martynov, Sanamyan & Korshunova, 2015)
 Doris bertheloti (d'Orbigny, 1839)
 Doris bicolor (Bergh, 1884)
 Doris bovena Er. Marcus, 1955
 Doris caeca (Valdés, 2001)
 Doris cameroni (Allan, 1947)
 Doris capensis (Bergh, 1907)
 Doris chrysoderma Angas, 1864
 Doris claurina (Er. Marcus, 1959)
 Doris elegans Quoy & Gaimard, 1832
 Doris falklandica (Eliot, 1907)
 Doris flabellifera Cheeseman, 1881
 Doris fontainii d'Orbigny, 1837
 Doris fretterae T. E. Thompson, 1980
 Doris fulva (Eliot, 1907)
 Doris granulosa (Pease, 1860)
 Doris hayeki Ortea, 1998
 Doris ilo (Er. Marcus, 1955)
 Doris immonda Risbec, 1928
 Doris januarii (Bergh, 1878)
 Doris kerguelenensis (Bergh, 1884)
 Doris kpone Edmunds, 2013
 Doris kyolis (Ev. Marcus & Er. Marcus, 1967)
 Doris laboutei (Valdés, 2001)
 Doris magnotuberculata (Martynov, Sanamyan & Korshunova, 2015) 
 Doris marmorata Risso, 1818
 Doris minuta Edmunds, 2013
 Doris montereyensis J. G. Cooper, 1863
 Doris morenoi Ortea, 1989
 Doris nanula (Bergh, 1904)
 Doris nobilis Odhner, 1907
 Doris nucleola Pease, 1860
 Doris ocelligera (Bergh, 1881)
 Doris odhneri MacFarland, 1966
 Doris parrae Ortea, 2017
 Doris phyllophora Mørch, 1859 (species inquerenda)
 Doris pickensi Marcus & Marcus, 1967
 Doris pseudoargus Rapp, 1827
 Doris pseudoverrucosa (Ihering, 1886)
 Doris punctatissima Mørch, 1859 (species inquerenda)
 Doris scripta (Bergh, 1907)
 Doris sticta (Iredale & O'Donoghue, 1923)
 Doris sugashimae (Baba, 1998)
 Doris tanya Ev. Marcus, 1971
 Doris tricolor (Baba, 1938)
 Doris umbrella Rochebrune, 1895 (species inquerenda)
 Doris verrucosa Linnaeus, 1758
 Doris violacea (Bergh, 1904) 
 Doris viridis (Pease, 1861)
 Doris wellingtonensis Abraham, 1877

 Species brought into synonymy
 Doris affinis Gmelin, 1791 synonym of Flabellina affinis (Gmelin, 1791)
 Doris albescens Schultz in Philippi, 1836: synonym of Felimida purpurea (Risso in Guérin, 1831)
 Doris albopunctata J. G. Cooper, 1863: synonym of Doriopsilla albopunctata (J. G. Cooper, 1863)
 Doris albopustulosa Pease, 1860: synonym of Goniobranchus albopustulosus (Pease, 1860)
 Doris amabilis Kelaart, 1859: synonym of Chromodoris aspersa (Gould, 1852)
 Doris angustipes Mörch, 1863: synonym of Platydoris angustipes (Mörch, 1863)
 Doris apiculata Alder & Hancock, 1864: synonym of Sclerodoris apiculata (Alder & Hancock, 1864)
 Doris arborescens Müller O.F., 1776: synonym of Dendronotus frondosus (Ascanius, 1774)
 Doris arbutus Angas, 1864: synonym of Rostanga arbutus (Angas, 1864)
 Doris areolata Alder & Hancock, 1864: synonym of Dendrodoris areolata (Alder & Hancock, 1864)
 Doris areolata Stuwitz, 1836: synonym of Doris pseudoargus Rapp, 1827
 Doris argo Linnaeus, 1767: synonym of Platydoris argo (Linnaeus, 1767)
 Doris aspera Alder & Hancock, 1842: synonym of Onchidoris muricata (O. F. Müller, 1776)
 Doris aspersa Gould, 1852: synonym of Chromodoris aspersa (Gould, 1852)
 Doris atrata Kelaart, 1858: synonym of Dendrodoris fumata (Rüppell & Leuckart, 1830)
 Doris atromarginata Cuvier, 1804: synonym of Doriprismatica atromarginata (Cuvier, 1804)
 Doris atroviridis Kelaart, 1858: synonym of Dendrodoris nigra (Stimpson, 1855)
 Doris aurantiaca Eliot, 1913: synonym of Doris granulosa (Pease, 1860)
 Doris aurea Quoy & Gaimard, 1832: synonym of Dendrodoris aurea (Quoy & Gaimard, 1832): synonym of Doriopsilla aurea (Quoy & Gaimard, 1832)
 Doris auriculata Müller, 1776: synonym of Facelina auriculata (Müller, 1776)
 Doris aurita Gould, 1852: synonym of Gymnodoris aurita (Gould, 1852)
 Doris barnardi Collingwood, 1868: synonym of Chromodoris barnardi (Collingwood, 1868) (species inquirenda)
 Doris barvicensis Johnston, 1838: synonym of Goniodoris nodosa (Montagu, 1808)
 Doris beaumonti Farran, 1903: synonym of Diaphorodoris luteocincta (M. Sars, 1870)
 Doris bifida Montagu, 1815: synonym of Hermaea bifida (Montagu, 1815)
 Doris bifida Verrill, 1870: synonym of Acanthodoris pilosa (Abildgaard in Müller, 1789)
 Doris bilamellata Linnaeus, 1767: synonym of Onchidoris bilamellata (Linnaeus, 1767)
 Doris biscayensis P. Fischer, 1872: synonym of Doris verrucosa Linnaeus, 1758
 Doris bistellata Verrill, 1900: synonym of Aphelodoris antillensis Bergh, 1879
 Doris bodoensis Gunnerus, 1770: synonym of Aeolidia papillosa (Linnaeus, 1761)
 Doris branchialis Rathke, 1806: synonym of Favorinus branchialis (Rathke, 1806)
 Doris brittanica Johnston, 1838: synonym of Doris pseudoargus Rapp, 1827
 Doris caerulea Montagu, 1804: synonym of Cuthona caerulea (Montagu, 1804)
 Doris caerulea Risso, 1826: synonym of Felimare villafranca (Risso, 1818)
 Doris calcarae Vérany, 1846: synonym of Felimare picta (Schultz in Philippi, 1836)
 Doris canariensis d'Orbigny, 1839: synonym of Platydoris argo (Linnaeus, 1767)
 Doris carbunculosa Kelaart, 1858: synonym of Dendrodoris carbunculosa (Kelaart, 1858)
 Doris cardinalis Gould, 1852: synonym of Hexabranchus sanguineus (Rüppell & Leuckart, 1830)
 Doris carinata Quoy & Gaimard, 1832: synonym of Atagema carinata (Quoy & Gaimard, 1832)
 Doris carneola Angas, 1864: synonym of Doriopsilla carneola (Angas, 1864)
 Doris castanea Kelaart, 1858: synonym of Sclerodoris tuberculata Eliot, 1904
 Doris clavigera O. F. Müller, 1776: synonym of Limacia clavigera (O. F. Müller, 1776)
 Doris coccinea Forbes, 1848: synonym of Rostanga rubra (Risso, 1818)
 Doris coerulea Risso, 1818: synonym of Felimare villafranca (Risso, 1818)
 Doris complanata Verrill, 1880: synonym of Geitodoris planata (Alder & Hancock, 1846)
 Doris concinna Alder & Hancock, 1864: synonym of Montereina concinna (Alder & Hancock, 1864)
 Doris cornuta Rathke, 1806: synonym of Polycera quadrilineata (O. F. Müller, 1776)
 Doris coronata Gmelin, 1791: synonym of Doto coronata (Gmelin, 1791)
 Doris crucis Ørsted in Mörch, 1863: synonym of Discodoris crucis (Ørsted in Mörch, 1863) (nomen dubium)
 Doris cruenta Quoy & Gaimard, 1832: synonym of Platydoris cruenta (Quoy & Gaimard, 1832)
 Doris debilis Pease, 1871: synonym of Dendrodoris nigra (Stimpson, 1855)
 Doris decora Pease, 1860: synonym of Goniobranchus decorus (Pease, 1860)
 Doris delicata Abraham, 1877: synonym of Tyrinna delicata (Abraham, 1877)
 Doris denisoni Angas, 1864: synonym of Dendrodoris krusensternii (Gray, 1850)
 Doris depressa Alder & Hancock, 1842: synonym of Onchidoris depressa (Alder & Hancock, 1842)
 Doris derelicta P. Fischer, 1867: synonym of Doris verrucosa Linnaeus, 1758
 Doris diaphana Alder & Hancock, 1845: synonym of Onchidoris muricata (O. F. Müller, 1776)
 Doris dorsalis Gould, 1852: synonym of Mexichromis lemniscata (Quoy & Gaimard, 1832)
 Doris echinata Pease, 1860: synonym of Atagema echinata (Pease, 1860)
 Doris elegans Cantraine, 1835: synonym of Felimare picta (Schultz in Philippi, 1836)
 Doris elegantula Philippi, 1844: synonym of Felimida elegantula (Philippi, 1844)
 Doris ellioti Alder & Hancock, 1864: synonym of Platydoris ellioti (Alder & Hancock, 1864)
 Doris elongata Thompson W., 1840: synonym of Goniodoris nodosa (Montagu, 1808)
 Doris eolida Quoy & Gaimard, 1832: synonym of Okenia eolida (Quoy & Gaimard, 1832)
 Doris  Fischer P., 1872: synonym of Doris sticta (Iredale & O'Donoghue, 1923)
 Doris fasciculata Gmelin, 1791: synonym of Fiona pinnata (Eschscholtz, 1831)
 Doris fidelis Kelaart, 1858: synonym of Goniobranchus fidelis (Kelaart, 1858)
 Doris fimbriata Delle Chiaje, 1841: synonym of Kaloplocamus ramosus (Cantraine, 1835)
 Doris flammulatus Quoy & Gaimard, 1832: synonym of Hexabranchus sanguineus (Rüppell & Leuckart, 1830)
 Doris flava Montagu, 1804: synonym of Polycera quadrilineata (O. F. Müller, 1776)
 Doris flavipes Leuckart, 1828: synonym of Doris pseudoargus Rapp, 1827
 Doris flemingi Forbes, 1838: synonym of Acanthodoris pilosa (Abildgaard in Müller, 1789)
 Doris flemingii Forbes, 1838: synonym of Acanthodoris pilosa (Abildgaard in Müller, 1789)
 Doris fontainei Hupé, 1854: synonym of Doris fontainii d'Orbigny, 1837
 Doris formosa Alder & Hancock, 1864: synonym of Platydoris formosa (Alder & Hancock, 1864)
 Doris fragilis Alder & Hancock, 1864: synonym of Sebadoris fragilis (Alder & Hancock, 1864)
 Doris fumata Rüppell & Leuckart, 1830: synonym of Dendrodoris fumata (Rüppell & Leuckart, 1830)
 Doris funebris Kelaart, 1859: synonym of Jorunna funebris (Kelaart, 1859)
 Doris fusca Müller, 1776: synonym of Onchidoris bilamellata (Linnaeus, 1767)
 Doris glabella Bergh, 1907: synonym of Discodoris glabella (Bergh, 1907)
 Doris glabra Friele & Hansen, 1876: synonym of Cadlina glabra (Friele & Hansen, 1876)
 Doris gleniei Kelaart, 1858: synonym of Goniobranchus gleniei (Kelaart, 1858)
 Doris gracilis Rapp, 1827: synonym of Felimare villafranca (Risso, 1818)
 Doris grandiflora Rapp, 1827: synonym of Dendrodoris grandiflora (Rapp, 1827)
 Doris grandiflora Pease, 1860: synonym of Hoplodoris grandiflora (Pease, 1860)
 Doris grandifloriger Abraham, 1877: synonym of Hoplodoris grandiflora (Pease, 1860)
 Doris granosa Bergh, 1907 is a synonym of Doris verrucosa Linnaeus, 1758
 Doris granulata Ehrenberg, 1831: synonym of Sebadoris fragilis (Alder & Hancock, 1864)
 Doris grisea Kelaart, 1858: synonym of Dendrodoris grisea (Kelaart, 1858)
 Doris guttata Risso, 1826: synonym of Dendrodoris grandiflora (Rapp, 1827)
 Doris hispida d'Orbigny, 1834: synonym of Diaulula hispida (d'Orbigny, 1834)
 Doris humberti Kelaart, 1858: synonym of Glossodoris humberti (Kelaart, 1858)
 Doris illuminata Gould, 1841: synonym of Palio dubia (M. Sars, 1829)
 Doris impudica Rüppell & Leuckart, 1830: synonym of Gymnodoris impudica (Rüppell & Leuckart, 1830)
 Doris incii Gray, 1850: synonym of Halgerda willeyi Eliot, 1904
 Doris inconspicua Alder & Hancock, 1851: synonym of Onchidoris inconspicua (Alder & Hancock, 1851)
 Doris infravalvata Abraham, 1877: synonym of Platydoris argo (Linnaeus, 1767)
 Doris infucata Rüppell & Leuckart, 1830: synonym of Hypselodoris infucata (Rüppell & Leuckart, 1830)
 Doris intecta Kelaart, 1859: synonym of Atagema intecta (Kelaart, 1859)
 Doris johnstoni Alder & Hancock, 1845: synonym of Jorunna tomentosa (Cuvier, 1804)
 Doris krohni Vérany, 1846: synonym of Felimida krohni (Vérany, 1846)
 Doris labifera Abraham, 1877: synonym of Montereina labifera (Abraham, 1877)
 Doris lacera Cuvier, 1804: synonym of Hexabranchus sanguineus (Rüppell & Leuckart, 1830)
 Doris laevis Linnaeus, 1767: synonym of Cadlina laevis (Linnaeus, 1767)
 Doris laevis Gray M.E., 1850: synonym of Acanthodoris pilosa (Abildgaard in Müller, 1789)
 Doris lanuginata Abraham, 1877: synonym of Alloiodoris lanuginata (Abraham, 1877)
 Doris lemniscata Quoy & Gaimard, 1832: synonym of Mexichromis lemniscata (Quoy & Gaimard, 1832)
 Doris leuckarti Delle Chiaje, 1841: synonym of Doris pseudoargus Rapp, 1827
 Doris leuckartii Delle Chiaje, 1841: synonym of Doris pseudoargus Rapp, 1827
 Doris lilacina Gould, 1852: synonym of Tayuva lilacina (Gould, 1852)
 Doris limbata Cuvier, 1804: synonym of Dendrodoris limbata (Cuvier, 1804)
 Doris lineolata van Hasselt, 1824: synonym of Chromodoris lineolata (van Hasselt, 1824)
 Doris longicornis Montagu, 1808: synonym of Facelina auriculata (Müller, 1776)
 Doris loveni Alder & Hancock, 1862: synonym of Adalaria loveni (Alder & Hancock, 1862)
 Doris luctuosa Cheeseman, 1882: synonym of Aphelodoris luctuosa (Cheeseman, 1882)
 Doris lugubris Ehrenberg, 1828: synonym of Dendrodoris limbata (Cuvier, 1804)
 Doris lugubris (Gravenhorst, 1831): synonym of Doris lugubris Ehrenberg, 1828
 Doris luteocincta M. Sars, 1870: synonym of Diaphorodoris luteocincta (M. Sars, 1870)
 Doris luteorosea Rapp, 1827: synonym of Felimida luteorosea (Rapp, 1827)
 Doris lutescens Delle Chiaje in Verany, 1846: synonym of Felimare picta (Schultz in Philippi, 1836)
 Doris maccarthyi Kelaart, 1859: synonym of Doriprismatica atromarginata (Cuvier, 1804)
 Doris maculata Montagu, 1804: synonym of Doto maculata (Montagu, 1804)
 Doris maculata Garstang, 1896: synonym of Doris sticta (Iredale & O'Donoghue, 1923)
 Doris magnifica Quoy & Gaimard, 1832: synonym of Chromodoris magnifica (Quoy & Gaimard, 1832)
 Doris marginata Montagu, 1804: synonym of Cadlina laevis (Linnaeus, 1767)
 Doris marginata Pease, 1860: synonym of Goniobranchus verrieri (Crosse, 1875)
 Doris marginata Quoy & Gaimard, 1832: synonym of Hexabranchus sanguineus (Rüppell & Leuckart, 1830)
 Doris marginatus Quoy & Gaimard, 1832: synonym of Hexabranchus sanguineus (Rüppell & Leuckart, 1830)
 Doris mariei Crosse, 1875: synonym of Dendrodoris nigra (Stimpson, 1855)
 Doris marplatensis Franceschi, 1928: synonym of Polycera quadrilineata (O. F. Müller, 1776)
 Doris maura Forbes, 1840: synonym of Aegires punctilucens (d'Orbigny, 1837)
 Doris mera Alder & Hancock, 1844: synonym of Archidoris pseudoargus (Rapp, 1827): synonym of Doris pseudoargus Rapp, 1827
 Doris millegrana Alder & Hancock, 1854: synonym of Aporodoris millegrana (Alder & Hancock, 1854)
 Doris muricata O. F. Müller, 1776: synonym of Onchidoris muricata (O. F. Müller, 1776)
 Doris murrea Abraham, 1877: synonym of Peltodoris murrea (Abraham, 1877)
 Doris muscula Abraham, 1877: synonym of Rostanga muscula (Abraham, 1877)
 Doris nardi Vérany, 1846: synonym of Felimare picta (Schultz in Philippi, 1836)
 Doris nardii Vérany, 1846: synonym of Felimare picta (Schultz in Philippi, 1836)
 Doris natalensis Krauss, 1848: synonym of Discodoris natalensis (Krauss, 1848)
 Doris nigra Stimpson, 1855: synonym of Dendrodoris nigra (Stimpson, 1855)
 Doris nigricans Fleming, 1820: synonym of Acanthodoris pilosa (Abildgaard in Müller, 1789)
 Doris nigricans Otto, 1823: synonym of Dendrodoris limbata (Cuvier, 1804)
 Doris nodosa Montagu, 1808: synonym of Goniodoris nodosa (Montagu, 1808)
 Doris nodulosa Angas, 1864: synonym of Hoplodoris nodulosa (Angas, 1864)
 Doris nubilosa Pease, 1871: synonym of Sebadoris nubilosa (Pease, 1871)
 Doris oblonga Alder & Hancock, 1845: synonym of Onchidoris oblonga (Alder & Hancock, 1845)
 Doris obsoleta Rüppell & Leuckart, 1830: synonym of Goniobranchus obsoletus (Rüppell & Leuckart, 1830)
 Doris obvelata Müller O.F., 1776: synonym of Cadlina laevis (Linnaeus, 1767)
 Doris obvelata Johnston, 1838: synonym of Jorunna tomentosa (Cuvier, 1804)
 Doris odonoghuei Steinberg, 1963: synonym of Diaulula odonoghuei (Steinberg, 1963)
 Doris olivacea Verrill, 1900: unaccepted
 Doris orbignyi H. Adams & A. Adams, 1858: synonym of Montereina punctifera (Abraham, 1877)
 Doris ornata Ehrenberg, 1831: synonym of Atagema ornata (Ehrenberg, 1831)
 Doris ornata (d'Orbigny, 1837): synonym of Polycera quadrilineata (O. F. Müller, 1776)
 Doris orsinii Vérany, 1846: synonym of Felimare orsinii (Vérany, 1846)
 Doris osseosa Kelaart, 1859: synonym of Atagema osseosa (Kelaart, 1859)
 Doris pallida Rüppell & Leuckart, 1830: synonym of Glossodoris pallida (Rüppell & Leuckart, 1830)
 Doris pantherina Angas, 1864: synonym of Jorunna pantherina (Angas, 1864)
 Doris pardalis Alder & Hancock, 1864: synonym of Montereina pardalis (Alder & Hancock, 1864)
 Doris pareti Vérany, 1846: synonym of Goniodoris castanea Alder & Hancock, 1845
 Doris pasini Vérany, 1846: synonym of Felimare villafranca (Risso, 1818)
 Doris pecten Collingwood, 1881: synonym of Doris granulosa (Pease, 1860)
 Doris peculiaris Abraham, 1877: synonym of Doriopsilla peculiaris (Abraham, 1877)
 Doris pedata Montagu, 1815: synonym of Flabellina pedata (Montagu, 1815)
 Doris pellucida Risso, 1826: synonym of Cadlina pellucida (Risso, 1826)
 Doris pennigera Montagu, 1815: synonym of Thecacera pennigera (Montagu, 1815)
 Doris peregrina Gmelin, 1791: synonym of Cratena peregrina (Gmelin, 1791)
 Doris perplexa Bergh, 1907: synonym of Discodoris perplexa (Bergh, 1907)
 Doris peruviana d'Orbigny, 1837: synonym of Baptodoris peruviana (d'Orbigny, 1837)
 Doris petechialis Gould, 1852: synonym of Goniobranchus petechialis (Gould, 1852)
 Doris philippii Weinkauff, 1873: synonym of Jorunna tomentosa (Cuvier, 1804)
 Doris picta Schultz in Philippi, 1836: synonym of Felimare picta (Schultz in Philippi, 1836)
 Doris picturata Ehrenberg, 1831: synonym of Hypselodoris picturata (Ehrenberg, 1831)
 Doris pilosa Abildgaard in Müller, 1789: synonym of Acanthodoris pilosa (Abildgaard in Müller, 1789)
 Doris pinnatifida Montagu, 1804: synonym of Doto pinnatifida (Montagu, 1804)
 Doris  Vérany, 1846: synonym of Felimida purpurea (Risso in Guérin, 1831)
 Doris planata Alder & Hancock, 1846: synonym of Geitodoris planata (Alder & Hancock, 1846)
 Doris planulata Stimpson, 1853: synonym of Cadlina laevis (Linnaeus, 1767)
 Doris porri Vérany, 1846: synonym of Paradoris indecora (Bergh, 1881)
 Doris preciosa Kelaart, 1858: synonym of Goniobranchus preciosus (Kelaart, 1858)
 Doris prismatica Pease, 1860: synonym of Glossodoris prismatica (Pease, 1860)
 Doris propinquata Pease, 1860: synonym of Goniobranchus vibratus (Pease, 1860)
 Doris proxima Alder & Hancock, 1854: synonym of Adalaria proxima (Alder & Hancock, 1854)
 Doris pseudida Bergh, 1907: synonym of Discodoris pseudida (Bergh, 1907)
 Doris pulchella Rüppell & Leuckart, 1830: synonym of Hypselodoris pulchella (Rüppell & Leuckart, 1830)
 Doris pulchella Aradas, 1847: synonym of Doris bicolor (Bergh, 1884)
 Doris pulcherrima Cantraine, 1835: synonym of Felimare villafranca (Risso, 1818)
 Doris punctata d'Orbigny, 1839: synonym of Montereina punctifera (Abraham, 1877)
 Doris punctifera Abraham, 1877: synonym of Montereina punctifera (Abraham, 1877)
 Doris punctulifera Bergh, 1874: synonym of Chromodoris aspersa (Gould, 1852)
 Doris punctuolata d'Orbigny, 1837: synonym of Diaulula punctuolata (d'Orbigny, 1837)
 Doris purpurea Risso in Guérin, 1831: synonym of Felimida purpurea (Risso in Guérin, 1831)
 Doris pusilla Alder & Hancock, 1845: synonym of Onchidoris pusilla (Alder & Hancock, 1845)
 Doris pustulata Abraham, 1877: synonym of Hoplodoris nodulosa (Angas, 1864)
 Doris pustulosa Cuvier, 1804: synonym of Ceratosoma pustulosum (Cuvier, 1804)
 Doris quadrangulata Jeffreys, 1869: synonym of Acanthodoris pilosa (Abildgaard in Müller, 1789)
 Doris quadricolor Rüppell & Leuckart, 1830: synonym of Chromodoris quadricolor (Rüppell & Leuckart, 1830)
 Doris quadricornis Montagu, 1815: synonym of Okenia aspersa (Alder & Hancock, 1845)
 Doris quadrilineata O. F. Müller, 1776: synonym of Polycera quadrilineata (O. F. Müller, 1776)
 Doris radiata Gmelin, 1791: synonym of Glaucus atlanticus Forster, 1777
 Doris ramosa Cantraine, 1835: synonym of Kaloplocamus ramosus (Cantraine, 1835)
 Doris rappi Cantraine, 1841: synonym of Dendrodoris limbata (Cuvier, 1804)
 Doris raripilosa Abraham, 1877: synonym of Asteronotus raripilosus (Abraham, 1877)
 Doris repanda Alder & Hancock, 1842: synonym of Cadlina laevis (Linnaeus, 1767)
 Doris reticulata Quoy & Gaimard, 1832: synonym of Goniobranchus reticulatus (Quoy & Gaimard, 1832)
 Doris reticulata Schultz in Philippi, 1836: synonym of Doriopsilla areolata Bergh, 1880
 Doris rocinela Leach, 1852: synonym of Acanthodoris pilosa (Abildgaard in Müller, 1789)
 Doris rubicunda Cheeseman, 1881: synonym of Rostanga muscula (Abraham, 1877)
 Doris rubra Kelaart, 1858: synonym of Dendrodoris fumata (Rüppell & Leuckart, 1830)
 Doris rubra Risso, 1818: synonym of Rostanga rubra (Risso, 1818)
 Doris rubrilineata Pease, 1871: synonym of Dendrodoris nigra (Stimpson, 1855)
 Doris sandiegensis J. G. Cooper, 1863: synonym of Diaulula sandiegensis (J. G. Cooper, 1863)
 Doris sandwichensis Eydoux & Souleyet, 1852: synonym of Hexabranchus sanguineus (Rüppell & Leuckart, 1830)
 Doris sanguinea Rüppell & Leuckart, 1830: synonym of Hexabranchus sanguineus (Rüppell & Leuckart, 1830)
 Doris scacchi Delle Chiaje, 1830: synonym of Felimare picta (Schultz in Philippi, 1836)
 Doris schembrii Vérany, 1846: synonym of Doris pseudoargus Rapp, 1827
 Doris schmeltziana Bergh, 1875: synonym of Discodoris schmeltziana (Bergh, 1875)
 Doris schultzii Delle Chiaje, 1841: synonym of Felimare villafranca (Risso, 1818)
 Doris setigera Rapp, 1827: synonym of Dendrodoris limbata (Cuvier, 1804)
 Doris sibirica Aurivillius, 1887: synonym of Calycidoris guentheri Abraham, 1876
 Doris similis Alder & Hancock, 1842: synonym of Acanthodoris pilosa (Abildgaard in Müller, 1789)
 Doris sinuata van Hasselt, 1824: synonym of Miamira sinuata (van Hasselt, 1824)
 Doris sismondae Vérany, 1846: synonym of Dendrodoris limbata (Cuvier, 1804)
 Doris sordida Quoy & Gaimard, 1832: synonym of Sebadoris fragilis (Alder & Hancock, 1864)
 Doris sordida Pease, 1871: synonym of Dendrodoris nigra (Stimpson, 1855)
 Doris sordida Rüppell & Leuckart, 1830: synonym of Sebadoris fragilis (Alder & Hancock, 1864)
 Doris sordidata Abraham, 1877: synonym of Sebadoris fragilis (Alder & Hancock, 1864)
 Doris sparsa Alder & Hancock, 1846: synonym of Onchidoris sparsa (Alder & Hancock, 1846)
 Doris speciosa Abraham, 1877: synonym of Platydoris ellioti (Alder & Hancock, 1864)
 Doris sponsa Ehrenberg, 1831: synonym of Chromodoris sponsa (Ehrenberg, 1831)
 Doris stellata Gmelin, 1791: synonym of Acanthodoris pilosa (Abildgaard in Müller, 1789)
 Doris stragulata Abraham, 1877: synonym of Sebadoris fragilis (Alder & Hancock, 1864)
 Doris striata Kelaart, 1858: synonym of Platydoris striata (Kelaart, 1858)
 Doris sublaevis Thompson, 1840: synonym of Acanthodoris pilosa (Abildgaard in Müller, 1789)
 Doris subquadrata Alder & Hancock, 1845: synonym of Acanthodoris pilosa (Abildgaard in Müller, 1789)
 Doris subtumida Abraham, 1877: synonym of Platydoris argo (Linnaeus, 1767)
 Doris sumptuosa Gould, 1852: synonym of Hexabranchus sanguineus (Rüppell & Leuckart, 1830)
 Doris superba Gould, 1852: synonym of Hexabranchus sanguineus (Rüppell & Leuckart, 1830)
 Doris tabulata Abraham, 1877: synonym of Platydoris tabulata (Abraham, 1877) 

 Doris tenera O. G. Costa: synonym of Felimare villafranca (Risso, 1818)
 Doris tennentana Kelaart, 1859: synonym of Goniobranchus tennentanus (Kelaart, 1859)
 Doris testudinaria Risso, 1826: synonym of Geitodoris planata (Alder & Hancock, 1846)
 Doris tinctoria Rüppell & Leuckart, 1830: synonym of Goniobranchus tinctorius (Rüppell & Leuckart, 1830)
 Doris tomentosa Cuvier, 1804: synonym of Jorunna tomentosa (Cuvier, 1804)
 Doris tricolor Cantraine, 1835: synonym of Felimare tricolor (Cantraine, 1835)
 Doris trifida J.E. Gray, 1850: synonym of Ceratosoma trilobatum (J.E. Gray, 1827)
 Doris trilobata J.E. Gray, 1827: synonym of Ceratosoma trilobatum (J.E. Gray, 1827)
 Doris tristis Alder & Hancock, 1864: synonym of Atagema tristis (Alder & Hancock, 1864)
 Doris tuberculosa Quoy & Gaimard, 1832: synonym of Dendrodoris tuberculosa (Quoy & Gaimard, 1832)
 Doris  Thompson W., 1845: synonym of Onchidoris muricata (O. F. Müller, 1776)
 Doris valenciennesi Cantraine, 1841: synonym of Felimare picta (Schultz in Philippi, 1836)
 Doris varia Abraham, 1877: synonym of Aphelodoris varia (Abraham, 1877)
 Doris variabilis Angas, 1864: synonym of Aphelodoris varia (Abraham, 1877)
 Doris variolata d'Orbigny, 1837: synonym of Diaulula variolata (d'Orbigny, 1837)
 Doris vermicelli Gould, 1852: synonym of Diaulula variolata (d'Orbigny, 1837)
 Doris  Turton, 1807: synonym of Aeolidia papillosa (Linnaeus, 1761)
 Doris vestita Abraham, 1877: synonym of Diaulula punctuolata (d'Orbigny, 1837)
 Doris vibrata Pease, 1860: synonym of Goniobranchus vibratus (Pease, 1860)
 Doris villae Vérany, 1846: synonym of Felimare villafranca (Risso, 1818)
 Doris villafranca Risso, 1818: synonym of Felimare villafranca (Risso, 1818)
 Doris villosa Alder & Hancock, 1864: synonym of Thordisa villosa (Alder & Hancock, 1864)
 Doris virescens Risso, 1826: synonym of Dendrodoris limbata (Cuvier, 1804)
 Doris xantholeuca Ehrenberg, 1831: synonym of Glossodoris pallida (Rüppell & Leuckart, 1830)
 Doris zetlandica Alder & Hancock, 1854: synonym of Aldisa zetlandica (Alder & Hancock, 1854)

References

Dorididae